Colour retention agents are food additives that are added to food to prevent the colour from changing. Many of them work by absorbing or binding to oxygen before it can damage food (antioxidants). For example, ascorbic acid (vitamin C) is often added to brightly coloured fruits such as peaches during canning.

List of colour retention agent

Notes

See also 
 Artificial sweetener
 Acidity regulator
 Codex Alimentarius
 E number
 Food colouring
 Food safety
 List of antioxidants in food
 List of food additives
 List of food additives, Codex Alimentarius
 List of fruits
 List of vegetables

Food additives